Kayaushka is a rural locality (a selo) and the administrative center of Kayaushinsky Selsoviet, Rodinsky District, Altai Krai, Russia. The population was 424 as of 2013. There are 4 streets.

Geography 
Zelyonaya Dubrava is the nearest rural locality.

References 

Rural localities in Rodinsky District